Harlan is a city in Shelby County, Iowa, along the West Nishnabotna River. The population was 4,893 at the time of the 2020 census. It is the county seat of Shelby County.

History
Harlan was platted in 1858. It was named for one of Iowa's early U.S. Senators, James Harlan. Harlan was designated county seat in 1859. The town was incorporated on May 2, 1879.

Geography
Harlan's longitude and latitude coordinates in decimal form are 41.654609, -95.322019.

Climate

Demographics

2020 census
At the 2020 census there were 4,893 people, 2,288 households, and 1,275 families living in the city. The racial makeup of the city was 90.8% White, 0.8% African American, 0.5% Native American, 0.8% Asian, 2.5% from other races, and 4.3% from two or more races. Hispanic or Latino of any race were 4.6%.

Of the 2,288 households, 21.5% had children under the age of 18 living with them, 45.3% were married couples living together, 7.5% had a female householder with no husband present, 3.0% had a male householder with no wife present, and 44.3% were non-families. 37.0% of households were one person and 17.9% were one person aged 65 or older. The average household size was 2.07 and the average family size was 2.75. 

The median age was 47.4 years. 20.3% of residents were under the age of 18; 29.2% were between the ages of 15 and 44; and 25.0% were 65 years or older. The gender makeup of the city was 43.5% male and 53.7% female.

2010 census
At the 2010 census there were 5,106 people, 2,222 households, and 1,341 families living in the city. The racial makeup of the city was 97.0% White, 0.5% African American, 0.4% Native American, 0.6% Asian, 0.6% from other races, and 0.9% from two or more races. Hispanic or Latino of any race were 1.9%.

Of the 2,222 households, 26.7% had children under the age of 18 living with them, 47.8% were married couples living together, 9.7% had a female householder with no husband present, 2.8% had a male householder with no wife present, and 39.6% were non-families. 34.2% of households were one person and 17.7% were one person aged 65 or older. The average household size was 2.26 and the average family size was 2.88.

The median age was 43.8 years. 23.8% of residents were under the age of 18; 6.1% were between the ages of 18 and 24; 21.4% were from 25 to 44; 27% were from 45 to 64; and 21.8% were 65 or older. The gender makeup of the city was 46.4% male and 53.6% female.

2000 census
At the 2000 census there were 5,282 people, 2,204 households, and 1,498 families living in the city. The racial makeup of the city was 98.30% White, 0.08% African American, 0.30% Native American, 0.47% Asian, 0.17% from other races, and 0.68% from two or more races. Hispanic or Latino of any race were 0.62%.

Of the 2,204 households, 31.1% included children under the age of 18; 56.6% were married couples living together, 8.9% consisted of a female householder with no husband present, and 32.0% were non-families. 28.9% of households were one person and 16.3% were one person aged 65 or older. The average household size was 2.35, and the average family size was 2.88.

25.1% are under the age of 18, 6.1% from 18 to 24, 24.2% from 25 to 44, 22.4% from 45 to 64, and 22.3% 65 or older. The median age was 41 years. For every 100 females, there were 90.9 males. For every 100 females age 18 and over, there were 85.4 males.

The median household income was $35,899 and the median family income was $45,888. Males had a median income of $31,365 versus $19,671 for females. The per capita income for the city was $17,514. About 5.3% of families and 7.0% of the population were below the poverty line, including 7.3% of those under age 18 and 9.4% of those age 65 or over.

Economy
A major Harlan employer is CDS Global, the Des Moines-based fulfillment house owned by the Hearst media conglomerate. Since this company provides subscription services for hundreds of periodicals, it is common to see a Harlan P.O. box as a magazine's customer service address.

Education

Primary or secondary schools 

Public schools in Harlan are governed and operated by the Harlan Community School District. The school district also serves residents of Jacksonville, Corley, Defiance, Panama, Portsmouth, Earling, and Westphalia. 
As of November 2021, the district has a student enrollment of 1,450. The district's racial demographics are 91.4% White, 5.7% Hispanic, 0.8% African American, and 2% non-white of other minorities.

The district operates four schools spread amongst two campuses,  all in Harlan:

 Harlan Primary School (K-2)
 Harlan Intermediate School (3-5)
 Harlan Community Middle School (6-8)
 Harlan Community High School (9-12)

Shelby County Catholic School is a private primary and elementary school in Harlan, Iowa. A department of St Michael's Catholic Church, it is the only private school in Harlan.

Notable people  

 Johnny Beauchamp, NASCAR driver with two career Cup Series wins
 Mary Lincoln Beckwith, great-grandchild of Abraham Lincoln
 Howard Webster Byers, Iowa Attorney General
 Susan Christensen, Iowa Supreme Court Chief Justice
 Billy Cundiff, NFL kicker, Washington Commanders
 Zach Daeges, baseball player
 George Sabin Gibbs, United States Army General
 Albert Hansen, college football coach
 Kij Johnson, author
 Greg Lansing, former Indiana State Sycamores men's basketball coach
 Jerry L. Larson, Iowa Supreme Court justice
 Tiny Lund (1929–1975) NASCAR driver and 1963 winner of the Daytona 500
 Raymond Eugene Plummer, lawyer and judge
 Lynn Reynolds, film director

See also

Building on the National Register of Historic Places
St. Paul's Episcopal Church
Shelby County Courthouse

References

External links
 
Harlan official website
City-Data Comprehensive Statistical Data and more about Harlan

 
Cities in Iowa
Cities in Shelby County, Iowa
County seats in Iowa